Martin Njøten Palumbo (born 5 March 2002) is a Norwegian professional footballer who plays as a midfielder for  club Juventus Next Gen, on loan from Udinese. Palumbo has represented both Norway and Italy internationally at youth level.

Club career 
On 2011 he joined the Udinese's youth system. He made his professional debut for the club on 2 August 2020 against Sassuolo. Five days later he extended his contract for Udinese until 2025. On 27 August 2021, Palumbo was loaned to Juventus U23 with option to buy. On 12 September, Palumbo debutted for Juventus U23 in a 1–0 defeat against Pro Patria. On 16 May 2022, he was first called up by the first team for a home match against Lazio, where he made his debut as a substitute. On 18 June, Juventus decided not to exercise the option to buy. However, on 1 September, he returned to Juventus U23, who had changed their name to Juventus Next Gen on 26 August.

International career
Palumbo was born in Norway to an Italian father and Norwegian mother, and moved to Italy at the age of three. He has both passports, and has represented both countries as a youth international.

Club statistics

Club

References

Notelist 

2002 births
Living people
Footballers from Bergen
Norwegian footballers
Norway youth international footballers
Italian footballers
Italy youth international footballers
Norwegian people of Italian descent
Italian people of Norwegian descent
Association football midfielders
Udinese Calcio players
Juventus Next Gen players
Juventus F.C. players
Serie A players
Serie C players